The Southwest Branch Rancocas Creek is a  tributary of the South Branch Rancocas Creek in Burlington County, New Jersey in the United States.

The Southwest Branch Rancocas Creek drains approximately 142 square kilometers.

Tributaries
Sharps Run
Little Creek

See also
List of rivers of New Jersey
North Branch Rancocas Creek
Rancocas Creek
South Branch Rancocas Creek

References

External links
 U.S. Geological Survey: NJ stream gaging stations

Rivers of Burlington County, New Jersey
Rivers of New Jersey
Tributaries of Rancocas Creek